Gandu Sidigundu is a 1991 Indian Kannada-language action film directed by M. S. Rajashekar, written by M. D. Sundar and produced by S. A. Srinivas. The film stars Ambareesh and Malashri. The film had cinematography by B. C. Gowrishankar and the dialogues and lyrics are written by Chi. Udaya Shankar.

The film's music was composed by Upendra Kumar and the audio was launched on the Lahari Music banner.

Plot

Cast 
Ambareesh
Malashri 
Thoogudeepa Srinivas
Shivaram
M. S. Rajashekar
Aravind
M. P. Shankar
Ashwath Narayan
Agro Chikkanna
Kishori Ballal
Malathi
Killankera

Soundtrack 
The music of the film was composed by Upendra Kumar, with lyrics by Chi. Udaya Shankar and Sri Ranga.

References 

1991 films
1990s Kannada-language films
Indian action films
Films scored by Upendra Kumar
1991 action films
Films directed by M. S. Rajashekar